Richard Magnus (born July 31, 1950) is a Canadian politician currently living in Alberta, Canada.

Magnus served as a municipal alderman for Calgary City Council representing Ward 4 from 1989 until his resignation in 1993. He was elected to the Legislative Assembly of Alberta in the 1993 Alberta general election to represent the Progressive Conservatives for Calgary North Hill. He served four terms in the legislature before declining to seek re-election in the 2008 election.

In 2001 he ran as a mayoral candidate in the 2001 Calgary municipal elections. He ended up finishing third in a hotly contested race, behind Dave Bronconnier and Bev Longstaff.

In late 2007, Magnus announced he would not seek reelection as an MLA in the next provincial election.

External links
Richard Magnus biography, Alberta Legislative Assembly
Elections, schmelections, FFWD Weekly April 11, 2002
City of Calgary Aldermanic biography Page 197

Progressive Conservative Association of Alberta MLAs
Living people
1950 births
Calgary city councillors
People from Happy Valley-Goose Bay
21st-century Canadian politicians